Spain competed at the 2022 World Championships in Athletics in Eugene, United States, from 15 July to 24 July 2022.

Medalists

Results 
The following athletes were selected.

Men
Track and road events

Field events

Women
Track and road events

Field events

Combined events – Heptathlon

Mixed

References

External links
Oregon22｜WCH 22｜World Athletics

Nations at the 2022 World Athletics Championships
Spain at the World Championships in Athletics
2022 in Spanish sport